North Malabar Institute of Technology is an engineering college located at Kanhangad, Kasaragod district, Kerala, India. It is affiliated to Kannur University.

References

External links
 

Engineering colleges in Kerala
Colleges affiliated to Kannur University
Colleges in Kasaragod district